The Boischaut is a natural region of France, astride on the Indre and Cher departments.

It is divided into two sub-regions: north and south.

Geography of Centre-Val de Loire